Lyudmila Yegorovna Shubina (born October 9, 1948) is a former Soviet/Azerbaijani handball player who competed in the 1976 Summer Olympics.

In 1976 she won the gold medal with the Soviet team. She played three matches including the final and scored seven goals.

External links
profile

1948 births
Living people
Soviet female handball players
Russian female handball players
Azerbaijani female handball players
Handball players at the 1976 Summer Olympics
Olympic handball players of the Soviet Union
Olympic gold medalists for the Soviet Union
Olympic medalists in handball
Medalists at the 1976 Summer Olympics